Brandon McGee (born December 11, 1990) is a former American football cornerback. He played college football at the University of Miami. He was selected by the St. Louis Rams in the fifth round of the 2013 NFL Draft.

Early years
At Plantation High School in Plantation, Florida, McGee finished senior year with 31 tackles, two interceptions, one sack and forced fumble and also had 300 receiving yards. As junior, played quarterback in seven games and threw for 1,100 passing yards with 13 touchdowns while also rushing for 450 yards. He was named first-team All-Broward County by The Miami Herald.

In track, he placed third in the 100 meters at the 2007 FHSAA 4A District 11 Championships, with a time of 10.83 seconds. As a University of Miami collegiate, he joined the track team and recorded a career-best time of 10.73 seconds in the 100 meters at the 2011 Georgia Tech Invitational. He also competed in the 60-meter dash, he ran a career-best time of 6.83 seconds at the prelims of the 2011 Rod McCravy Invitational.

College career
McGee attended the University of Miami, and was a member of the Miami Hurricanes football team from 2009 to 2012. He started 25 of 44 games during his career, recording 109 tackles, three interceptions and two sacks. As a senior in 2012, he started all 12 games at defensive back and finished tied for sixth on the team with 54 tackles. He recorded a team-high-tying two interceptions and also notched four tackles-for-loss.

Professional career

St. Louis Rams
McGee was drafted in the 5th round of the 2013 NFL Draft as the 149th pick by the St. Louis Rams.

On October 2, 2015, he was cut from the active roster.

New York Giants
On October 15, 2015, the New York Giants signed McGee to their practice squad. He was promoted to the active roster on October 18, 2015.

On October 31, 2015, the Giants announced they had waived McGee.

Detroit Lions
On August 23, 2016, McGee signed with the Detroit Lions. On August 30, 2016, McGee was waived by the Lions.

Personal life
McGee's father was diagnosed with throat cancer in 2000 and his mother with breast cancer in 2002. His mother died of the cancer in 2004.

References

External links
Miami Hurricanes bio 

1990 births
Living people
People from Plantation, Florida
McGee, Brandon
Players of American football from Florida
Sportspeople from Broward County, Florida
American football cornerbacks
Miami Hurricanes football players
St. Louis Rams players
New York Giants players
Detroit Lions players